Maria Josepha Karolina Eleonore Franziska Xaveria of Saxony (4 November 1731 – 13 March 1767) was Dauphine of France through her marriage to Louis, the son and heir of Louis XV. Marie Josèphe was the mother of three kings of France, Louis XVI, Louis XVIII and Charles X, as well as Madame Élisabeth.

Childhood
Maria Josepha was born on 4 November 1731 in Dresden Castle to Augustus III, Prince-Elector of Saxony, King of Poland and Grand Duke of Lithuania and Maria Josepha of Austria. Maria Josepha was the ninth of sixteen children born to the couple, and their fifth daughter.

Dauphin Louis, eldest son of King Louis XV of France, was widowed on 22 July 1746 when his wife, Infanta Maria Teresa, died giving birth to their only child, a daughter named after herself. King Ferdinand VI of Spain, Maria Teresa's half-brother, had offered the Dauphin another sister, Infanta Maria Antonia. Instead, the King of France and his mistress Madame de Pompadour wanted to open up diplomatic channels.

The marriage between Maria Josepha and the Dauphin had first been suggested by her uncle Maurice de Saxe. Louis XV and his mistress were convinced that the marriage would be advantageous to French foreign affairs. France and Saxony had been on opposing sides in the recent War of the Austrian Succession and thus the marriage between the Saxon princess and the Dauphin would form a new alliance between the two nations. There was one problem with the suggested bride: Maria Josepha's grandfather Augustus II of Poland had deposed Stanislaus I Leszczyński from the Polish throne. Leszczyński was the father of Maria Leszczyńska, Louis XV's wife and mother of the Dauphin. The marriage was said to have humiliated the simple-living Queen, even though she and Maria Josepha would later get on well.

Other proposals came from Savoy in the form of Princess Eleonora of Savoy or her sister Maria Luisa of Savoy. Both were refused. Despite the disapproval of the Queen, Maria Josepha married the Dauphin on 9 February 1747.

Dauphine 

Prior to the marriage, tradition demanded that the bride wear a bracelet which had a picture of her father on it; the Queen seeing the Dauphine asked to see the bracelet. The witty Maria Josepha then revealed the bracelet to the Queen, which showed a portrait of the Queen's father. The Dauphine said that the portrait represented the fact that the Duke of Lorraine was Maria Josepha's grandfather by marriage. The Queen and the court were strongly impressed by the tact of this girl of 15 years. The Dauphine was also very close to her father-in-law Louis XV.

At the time of the marriage, the Dauphin was still grieving for his Spanish wife. This grief was very public on the part of the Dauphin but Maria Josepha was praised greatly for her conquering the heart of the Dauphin "bit by bit". Despite Maria Josepha being the patient wife, the Dauphin's grief worsened in April 1748 when his only child with the Infanta died at the age of two. The Dauphin was deeply affected by the child's death. Maria Josepha later commissioned a painting (now lost) of her stepdaughter to be left over her cradle.

The new Dauphine was very grateful to Madame de Pompadour for helping arrange her marriage, and always maintained a good relationship with the royal mistress.

Like her husband, Maria Josepha was very devout. Together with her mother-in-law, she formed a counterbalance to the libertine behaviour of her father-in-law and his court. The couple were not fond of the various entertainments held at Versailles every week, preferring to stay in their apartments which can still be seen on the ground floor of Versailles overlooking the Orangerie.

The couple's first child was a daughter, born in 1750 on the feast day of Saint Zephyrinus and named Marie Zéphyrine. The birth was greeted with much joy by her parents even though Louis XV had been disappointed the child was not a male. She died in 1755. Their second child, Louis, was born on 15 September 1751. The royal couple concentrated so much time and energy on their eldest son that their other children suffered from neglect. He died on 22 March 1761 after having fallen from a toy horse. He started limping and a tumour began to grow on his hip. This was operated on, but he never recovered the use of his legs. The couple's second son, Xavier, was born in 1753, and died a year later. As a result, their third son, Louis Auguste, born on 23 August 1754, became second in line to the French throne after his father.

Thanks to Maria Josepha's close relationship with the King and the Dauphin, the relationship between father and son was soon repaired. The Dauphin was at the center of the Dévots, a group of religious-minded men who hoped to gain power when he succeeded to the throne. They were against the way Louis XV openly had affairs at court in blatant view of the Queen. Naturally they were not popular with Louis XV.

Her father-in-law named his loving daughter-in-law la triste Pepa; in 1756, Frederick II of Prussia invaded her native Saxony and that started the Seven Years' War, which France later joined. Politically reserved, she exerted herself only once, in 1762, in vain, for the preservation of the Society of Jesus in France. The Society had been dissolved by order of the Parlement of Paris, inspired by Jansenist magistrates, against the will of the King.

Later life
The death of her husband, on 20 December 1765, dealt Maria Josepha a devastating blow from which she never recovered, sinking into a deep depression which lasted till her own death 15 months later. 

Henriette Campan described the state of Maria Josepha during her widowhood: 
“The Dauphiness, his widow, was deeply afflicted; but the immoderate despair which characterised her grief induced many to suspect that the loss of the crown was an important part of the calamity she lamented. She long refused to eat enough to support life; she encouraged her tears to flow by placing portraits of the Dauphin in every retired part of her apartments. She had him represented pale, and ready to expire, in a picture placed at the foot of her bed, under draperies of gray cloth, with which the chambers of the Princesses were always hung in court mournings. Their grand cabinet was hung with black cloth, with an alcove, a canopy, and a throne, on which they received compliments of condolence after the first period of the deep mourning. The Dauphiness, some months before the end of her career, regretted her conduct in abridging it; but it was too late; the fatal blow had been struck. It may also be presumed that living with a consumptive, man had contributed to her complaint. This Princess had no opportunity of displaying her qualities; living in a Court in which she was eclipsed by the King and Queen, the only characteristics that could be remarked in her were her extreme attachment to her husband, and her great piety."

To save her the torment of remaining with memories of her dead husband, Louis XV re-arranged the allocation of apartments within Versailles, so that Maria Josepha moved out of the apartments that she had shared with her husband and into the apartments of Madame de Pompadour, who had died in 1764. There, the king visited her more than he had in the past, paid her many kind attentions, and discussed with her the possible wedding of her son, the new dauphin. Maria Josepha was not pleased with the idea of her eldest son marrying a daughter of Maria Theresa of Austria, in whose favour Maria Josepha's own mother (a cousin of Maria Theresa) had been disinherited.

Maria Josepha's health declined. She died on 13 March 1767 of tuberculosis, and was buried in the Cathedral of Saint-Étienne in Sens. The marriage of her son, the future Louis XVl, with Maria Theresa's daughter Marie Antoinette was celebrated three years later.

Issue
Stillborn son* (30 January 1748)
Stillborn son* (10 May 1749)
Marie Zéphyrine of France (26 August 1750 – 1 September 1755); died in childhood.
Louis Joseph of France, Duke of Burgundy (13 September 1751 – 22 March 1761); died in childhood.
Stillborn daughter* (9 March 1752)
Xavier of France, Duke of Aquitaine (8 September 1753 – 22 February 1754); died in infancy.
Louis XVI of France (23 August 1754 – 21 January 1793); married Marie Antoinette of Austria and had issue.
Louis XVIII of France (17 November 1755 – 16 September 1824); married Princess Marie Joséphine of Savoy, no issue.
Stillborn son* (1756)
Charles X of France (9 October 1757 – 6 November 1836); married Princess Maria Theresa of Savoy and had issue.
Marie Clotilde de France (23 September 1759 – 7 March 1802); married Charles Emmanuel IV of Sardinia, no issue.
Stillborn son* (1762)
Élisabeth of France (3 May 1764 – 10 May 1794); died unmarried.

Ancestry

See also
Nicolay (disambiguation)

References

House of Wettin
Dauphines of Viennois
Dauphines of France
Princesses of France (Bourbon)
Nobility from Dresden
Polish princesses
1731 births
1767 deaths
18th-century Polish people
18th-century Polish women
18th-century German people
18th-century German women
Albertine branch
Daughters of kings